The Tigers de Toulouse are a team in Division Élite. They have never won a league title but have finished second.

External links
 Official site

Division Élite teams
Baseball teams established in 1983
1983 establishments in France